Joy Ferrao (born 30 April 1987) is an Indian footballer who plays as a forward for Dempo S.C. in the I-League. Joy Ferrao was originally a youth player for Vasco SC and broke into the first-team in 2010 and became the top scorer for club and the whole league during the 2010 I-League 2nd Division.

Career

Vasco
Ferrao broke into the Vasco SC first team in time for the 2010 I-League 2nd Division. After the campaign Vasco did not win promotion but Ferrao became the top scorer of the league by scoring four goals throughout the campaign. The next season Ferrao again became top scorer but only for his club and he became the top assist provider as well.

Dempo
On 18 July 2011 Ferrao signed for two-time I-League champions Dempo S.C. for the 2011-12 I-League season. Ferrao made his Dempo debut during the first match of the 2011 Indian Federation Cup on 17 September 2011 against Pune and straight away he made his impact for the club by scoring in that game in the 87th minute. Dempo went on to lose the match 1–2. He then made his I-League debut on 2 November 2011 against Mohun Bagan, coming on as an 82nd minute substitution for Joaquim Abranches as Dempo won the match 5–0. Ferrao then scored his first goal for the club on 22 December 2011 against Sporting Clube de Goa in the I-League. Dempo won the match 3–2.

Ferrao then scored his second goal for the club on 19 January 2013 against United Sikkim F.C. at the Duler Stadium in which Dempo won 7–0 against the Snow Lions and Joy scoring in the 84th minute.

Career statistics

Club

References

Footballers from Goa
1987 births
Indian Christians
Living people
I-League players
Dempo SC players
Indian footballers
Association football forwards
People from Verna, Goa